Dichostates pygmaeus is a species of beetle in the family Cerambycidae. It was described by Téocchi in 2001.

References

Crossotini
Beetles described in 2001